Bay/Enterprise Square station is an Edmonton Light Rail Transit station in Edmonton, Alberta, Canada. It serves both the Capital Line and the Metro Line. It is an underground station located beneath Jasper Avenue between 103 Street and 104 Street in downtown Edmonton. It is named for both the former Hudson's Bay Company store and Enterprise Square, the University of Alberta's downtown campus.

The station was originally called Bay station.

History

On January 28, 2009, Edmonton City Council approved the decision to rename the station Bay/Enterprise Square as the former Bay building became the University of Alberta's downtown campus, Enterprise Square in 2008.

Station layout
The station has a  centre loading platform that can accommodate two five-car LRT trains at the same time, with one train on each side of the platform. The platform is just over eight metres wide. Access to the platform is from the concourse level by stairs and escalators located at each end of the platform. The concourse level is connected to the pedway system through Enterprise Square.

Around the station
Enterprise Square
All Saints' Anglican Cathedral
Canadian Western Bank Building
Downtown
First Presbyterian Church
Icon Towers
Red Arrow bus terminal

References

Edmonton Light Rail Transit stations
Railway stations in Canada opened in 1983
Railway stations in Canada at university and college campuses
Capital Line
Metro Line